Valley High School is the continuation high school for the Dublin Unified School District, located in Dublin, California. As of the 2018–2019 school year, it had a staff or 8 teachers for 72 students in grades 10–12.

References

External links 
 Valley High School official website

Educational institutions in the United States with year of establishment missing
Continuation high schools in California
Public high schools in California
Schools in Alameda County, California